Hum Sub Chor Hain, also known as The Criminals, is a 1973 Hindi crime action film directed by Marutirao Parab. The film stars Dara Singh and Sheikh Mukhtar in the lead roles. The film was released on 9 January 1973 and certified U by the Central Board of Film Certification.

Cast
 Dara Singh ... Mohan
 Sheikh Mukhtar ... Shaikh
 Shabnam ... Sheela
 Hiralal... Ram Singh / Shyam Singh
 Jagdish Raj ... Police Inspector Jagdish
 Daljeet ... Ramesh
 Kundan ... Manohar
 M.B. Shetty ... Shankar (as Shetty)
 Satyajeet	... Raju (as Master Satyajit)
 Roopali ... Mental Hospital Inmate
 Jayshree T. ... Qawwali Singer
 Saudagar Singh ... Ram Singh's Goon
 Trilok Singh ... Ram Singh's Goon
 Mohan Jerry ... The King of Chandanpur

Reception
Film historian Valentina Vitali described the film as  "cheap urban action films" in which Singh starred.

Soundtrack
The music was composed by Usha Khanna. Lyrics by Indivar, Asad Bhopali, Jan Nisar Akhtar
"Aaja Mere Saathi" - Asha Bhosle
"Dekhoon Kisko Chahoon Kisko" - Asha Bhosle
"Dil Humaara Ki Heere Se Kuchh KumNa Tha" - Krishna Kalle, Usha Khanna, Manhar Udhas, Mahendra Kapoor
"Panchhi Pinjare Mein Roye" - Hemlata, Suman Kalyanpur
"Tu Nahin Jaane" - Usha Khanna

References

External links
 

1973 films
Films scored by Usha Khanna
1970s Hindi-language films
1973 drama films